Bert Wright (2 December 1926 – 20 November 1994) was an Australian cricketer. He played three first-class cricket matches for Victoria between 1950 and 1951.

See also
 List of Victoria first-class cricketers

References

External links
 

1926 births
1994 deaths
Australian cricketers
Victoria cricketers
Cricketers from Melbourne